Fabchannel.com was a Dutch company that aimed to give attention to artists unrecognized by the mass media.
The project was founded by Justin Kniest in 2000 in collaboration with internet service provider XS4ALL and broadcast facility company N.O.B.

The website streamed free, live, and on-demand video from the Paradiso, Melkweg venues in Amsterdam, the Netherlands and The Roxy Theatre venue in Los Angeles.

With more than 900 live concerts, festivals, performances, debates and lectures, Fabchannel.com built a substantial concert video archive, their claim of being 'the largest concert video archive in the world' however being an exaggeration, given the far larger archives developed by major broadcasters such as BBC.

In April 2007 Fabchannel announced that it has launched its own channel on Joost, an online TV distribution platform. This channel, The Best Of Fab, shows a selection of the archive.

In November 2007, the city of Amsterdam and Foreman Capital each took a 25% share in Fabchannel. The city of Amsterdam paid 1.25 million euro for the share.

In February 2008 Fabchannel and Universal Music Netherlands announced a recording and multi-territory digital exploitation partnership for concert videos. This was a breakthrough for Fabchannel as this meant Fabchannel was able to record and stream concerts of artists signed by Universal. Despite this deal, the business model underlying Fabchannel proved difficult to maintain, with no clear source of direct revenue from the end users (viewers), and with copyright holders (artists and/or record labels) being reluctant to allow premium value content to be streamed for free. Moreover, notwithstanding tight security measures, Fabchannel content got pirated on places like YouTube and Peer-to-Peer filesharing networks.

On March 6, 2009, Kniest announced that the site would be shutting down the following Friday, March 13.  In an email to subscribers titled "Fabchannel Stops." Kniest wrote:

Awards
Spin Award: Winner Best Dutch Website Concept of 2003
EuroPrix.nl: Overall Winner Best Dutch E-Content Production 2005
Prix Europa: Winner Best European Website 2005
Webby Awards: Winner Best Music Website 2006
Musikexpress Style Award: Winner Best Media 2007
W3 Silver Award: Winner 2007
Best Dutch entertainment website of the year 2008

References

External links
I want my Fabchannel (interview with founder Justin Kniest)

Defunct Dutch websites
Dutch music websites
Internet properties disestablished in 2009
Internet properties established in 2000
Internet television channels
Defunct video on demand services